Roads in Azerbaijan are the main transport network in Azerbaijan. With the railway network still undergoing modernization and not covering the entire country, especially mountainous areas and other areas with difficult topography, the road system is the most important form of transport in the country. Its role is important both with national, and as an important transit country, with international traffic.

Overview 
Azerbaijan is an important country for international transit. The total length of the Azerbaijani road network is about 29,000 km, serving domestic cargo traffic and connecting to international highways. Because Azerbaijan's railway network is inadequate, roads provide the most important form of transport in the country. Highways are mostly in fair condition, but do not meet international standards for transit traffic. Smaller main and rural roads are in poor condition. All types of roads are undergoing rapid modernization with rehabilitation and extensions. For every 1,000 km2 of the national territory, there is 334 km of roads. In 2018, the Global Competitiveness Index ranked Azerbaijan 36th out of 137 countries for the quality (condition and extensiveness) of its road infrastructure.

History

The first modern paved roads in Azerbaijan were built in the 19th century when it was part of the Russian Empire.

Road classification

Motorways

The most important class of highways is motorways. They are designated with the letter M.

Azerbaijan has recently developed a network of multi-lane motorways, which are steadily being expanded. Especially around Baku, some of these roads are built to controlled-access highway standards. Most motorways have six lanes, whereas some in and near Baku may have up to eight. In the cities, the motorways are illuminated.

Highways

65 other highways are a level below M-level roads and connect main highways to communities. These highways are designated with the letter R. The highway network is four lanes wide, two in each direction. Like motorways, they are illuminated in the cities, but less frequently in towns. In Azerbaijan, highway signs are blue and the names of locations are printed in capital letters. The main highways in the country are:

Highway of local importance
Below R-level roads, highways of local importance connect M- and R-level roads to settlements. They are designated with Y for yerli (local). The road numbers are named in the format "Y-##-##", where # stands for a digit. The first two digits follow the same digits allocated to each district for license plates. The second pair of digits is assigned from 01 upwards in each district. Cities of republican significance do not have their individual codes, as there are no local roads, only republican, regional, and municipal.

References

See also
 Roads in Armenia
 Roads in Georgia (country)
 Roads in Kazakhstan
 Roads in Kyrgyzstan
 Roads in Tajikistan

 
Transport in Azerbaijan